Valentina Gavrilova (born 14 June 1985) is a road cyclist from Russia. She represented her nation at the 2006 UCI Road World Championships.

References

External links
 profile at Procyclingstats.com

1985 births
Russian female cyclists
Living people
Place of birth missing (living people)